The 1968–69 Montreal Canadiens season was the club's 60th season of play. The Canadiens would defeat the St. Louis Blues to win their 16th Stanley Cup championship in club history.

Regular season

Final standings

Record vs. opponents

Schedule and results

Playoffs

Quarter-final
 Versus New York Rangers

Montreal wins the series 4–0.

Semi-final
 Versus Boston Bruins

Montreal wins the series 4–2.

Stanley Cup Final

 Versus St. Louis Blues

Montreal wins the series 4–0.

Player statistics

Regular season
Scoring

Goaltending

Playoffs
Scoring

Goaltending

Awards and records
 Prince of Wales Trophy
 Conn Smythe Trophy: || Serge Savard, Montreal Canadiens
 Jean Beliveau, Runner-Up, Hart Trophy
 Jean Beliveau, Center, NHL Second All-Star Team
 Yvan Cournoyer, Right Wing, NHL Second All-Star Team
 Ted Harris, NHL Second All-Star Team

Transactions

Trades

Draft picks
Montreal's draft picks at the 1968 NHL Amateur Draft held at the Queen Elizabeth Hotel in Montreal, Quebec.

See also
 1968–69 NHL season
 List of Stanley Cup champions

References
 Canadiens on Hockey Database
 Canadiens on NHL Reference

Stanley Cup championship seasons
Montreal Canadiens seasons
Mon
Mon